Percy John Down (14 October 1883 – 24 June 1954) was an English rugby union player, best known as a commanding forward in the Bristol pack in the first decade of the twentieth century. He spent the major part of his playing career at the club, and in later life became club chairman.

Rugby career
Down joined Bristol at the beginning of the 1904/05 season from the Redland club, and made his full début against Pontypridd RFC in December 1905. Down rapidly established himself in the first team and gained himself a reputation as a tough and committed player. His performances were widely praised and meant he soon earned selection for Somerset.

His efforts were also recognised at international level: Down was chosen as a member of the 1908 British Lions tour to New Zealand and Australia, played three matches in New Zealand but fell overboard as the boat left for Australia. He was rescued by New Zealand players George A. Gillett and Arthur 'Bolla' Francis, who kept him afloat until a rope was lowered from the ship upon which Down was about to sail. In addition Down played once for England's national side, against Australia in 1909; the first meeting between the two nations. Although England lost 9 – 3, Down played with distinction but was never capped again.

Four days later Down, then Bristol's club captain, led a combined Bristol and Clifton R.F.C. XV against the Australian national side at Bristol's County Ground. The tourists won 11 – 3 in one of the finest games of the tour.

His last game for Bristol was against Devonport Albion R.F.C. in January 1910. In all Down had played 117 games for Bristol, scoring 12 tries, 36 points.

After World War II Down was elected Bristol's vice-chairman for the 1945/46 season, but he took over the running of the club when Chairman W.J. Houlden died in office. He served as chairman until 1953/54 but died suddenly during the close season, shortly after being awarded life membership. A memorial fund was established in his name which provided for repairs and developments to the hall under the stand.

Down's son-in-law, Denzil Golledge, was Bristol captain for the 1950/51 season.

References

Bristol Rugby profile

Biography
 

1883 births
1954 deaths
Bristol Bears players
British & Irish Lions rugby union players from England
England international rugby union players
English rugby union players
Rugby union locks
Rugby union players from Clifton, Bristol